{{Infobox animanga/Print
| type            = manga
| author          = Eriko Ono
| publisher       = Shogakukan
| publisher_en    = 
| demographic     = Shōjo, Kodomo
| magazine        = Ciao
| magazine_en     = 
| first           = 1995
| last            = 
| volumes         = 34
| volume_list     = 
}}

 is a Japanese shōjo comedy manga series by Eriko Ono. It has been published by Shogakukan in Ciao since 1995 and collected in 32 bound volumes. It is a sequel to an earlier series, and depicts the home and school life of a cheerful and energetic fifth-grade girl named Miiko.Kocchi Muite! Miiko was adapted as a 42-episode anime television series by Toei Animation, which was broadcast on TV Asahi from February 14, 1998, to February 6, 1999, as part of the Anime Syuukan DX! Mi-Pha-Pu anime series.

Characters
 is the protagonist of the series. She is an energetic and short student in fifth grade. Miiko loves eating, which becomes a problem because she gets fat easily (as shown in much of the episodes). Her best friends are Mari Shimura, Yuuko Ogawa, and Tappei Eguchi. She's often found hanging out with her friends or fighting with a boy called Tappei who seems to like Miiko a bit but was too shy to say it to her himself. He called her names instead and sometimes got on Miiko's nerves. .
 is Miiko's younger brother. Unlike his sister, he is very diligent and often teaches Miiko when she's having difficulties with her homework. Mamoru liked helping his family, even though it got on his nerves sometimes. .
 is Miiko's mother and is an editor of a magazine. 
 is Miiko's best friend. Her career is to be a mangaka. She is stern on Miiko but also a loyal friend. 
 is Miiko's friend. He seems to have a romantic interest towards Miiko as he is always teasing her. Although he appears to be hardcore and annoying, he is in fact a shy, and nice person.
 is Miiko's best friend. She is nice, smart and friendly. She is also Kenta's girlfriend.

Media

MangaKocchi Muite! Miiko is written and illustrated by Eriko Ono. It has been published by Shogakukan in the shōjo (aimed at pre- and early teen girls) manga magazine Ciao since 1995. Serial chapters have collected in 32 tankōbon. In addition, popular stories from the series have been reprinted in three  collections called .

AnimeKocchi Muite! Miiko was adapted as an anime television series produced by Toei Animation and directed by Takao Yoshizawa. It was broadcast in 42 episodes on TV Asahi from February 14, 1998, to February 6, 1999, as part of the Anime Syuukan DX! Mi-Pha-Pu'' anime series.

Reception
The series received the 1996 Shogakukan Manga Award for children's manga. Together, the first 25 volumes have sold 3.8 million copies.

References

External links
Official anime website 

Comedy anime and manga
Shogakukan manga
Toei Animation television
TV Asahi original programming
Winners of the Shogakukan Manga Award for children's manga